Illyricum may refer to:

 Illyria, a region in Southeastern Europe in classical antiquity, inhabited by ancient Illyrians
 Illyricum (Roman province), a Roman province that existed between 27 BC and 69/79 AD
 Diocese of Illyricum, a diocese of the Late Roman Empire
 Praetorian prefecture of Illyricum, one of four praetorian prefectures into which the Late Roman Empire was divided
 Illyrian Provinces, an autonomous province of France during the First French Empire 1809-1814
 Illyricum sacrum, a classic eight volume historical work, published from 1751 to 1819

Species and subspecies
 Pancratium illyricum, a flowering plant species
 Polystichum illyricum, a fern hybrid species
 Onopordum illyricum

See also
 Illyricus (disambiguation) 
 Illyrians (disambiguation)
 Illyrian (disambiguation)
 Illyria (disambiguation)